Elena Conis is an American writer and historian of medicine. Her work focuses on the history of medicine, public health, and the environment, with particular focuses on the history of vaccination, infectious diseases, and pesticides. She is currently an Associate Professor in the Graduate School of Journalism at the University of California, Berkeley.

Education and career
Elena Conis received her bachelor's degree in biology from Columbia University in 1996, followed by master's degrees in global health and environment and journalism from the University of California, Berkeley. While studying at Berkeley, she began to work as a columnist and features writer for the Los Angeles Times. An award-winning health journalist, she wrote for the paper's "Esoterica Medica", "Nutrition Lab", and "Supplements" columns until 2011.

After completing her PhD in the history of health sciences at the University of California, San Francisco, Conis joined the faculty of Emory University as an assistant professor in the Department of History and the Andrew W. Mellon Foundation Faculty Fellow in Health and the Humanities. She taught undergraduate and graduate courses on the history of health, medicine, and the environment. In 2016, Conis was a Cain Postdoctoral Fellow at the Science History Institute.

Conis is most prominently known for her 2015 book, Vaccine Nation: America’s Changing Relationship with Immunization, which was awarded the Arthur J. Viseltear Prize from the American Public Health Association.

Conis is currently Associate Professor of Journalism in the Graduate School of Journalism at the University of California, Berkeley, where she directs the joint master’s program in journalism and public health (MJ / MPH). She is a faculty affiliate of the Center for Science, Technology, Medicine, and Society; the Berkeley Center for Social Medicine; and the Department of Media Studies, at the University of California, Berkeley. She is also affiliated faculty of the Department of Humanities and Social Science at the University of California, San Francisco.

Selected bibliography

Books
 

Conis, Elena (2022). How to Sell a Poison: The Rise, Fall, and Toxic Return of DDT. Bold Type Books, 2022. ISBN  9781645036746

Journal articles

References

External links
 
 
 
 

American women historians
Living people
Writers from Berkeley, California
American women journalists
University of California, San Francisco alumni
Journalism teachers
University of California, San Francisco faculty
American medical historians
University of California, Berkeley Graduate School of Journalism faculty
University of California, Berkeley alumni
Columbia College (New York) alumni
21st-century American historians
21st-century American women writers
Year of birth missing (living people)
Historians from California